Thomas Muster was the defending champion and won in the final 6–3, 4–6, 6–4, 6–1 against Marcelo Ríos.

Seeds
A champion seed is indicated in bold text while text in italics indicates the round in which that seed was eliminated. The top eight seeds received a bye to the second round.

  Thomas Muster (champion)
  Jim Courier (semifinals)
  Yevgeny Kafelnikov (second round)
  Sergi Bruguera (third round)
  Marc Rosset (second round)
  Marcelo Ríos (final)
  Andriy Medvedev (second round)
  Todd Martin (quarterfinals)
  Gilbert Schaller (first round)
  Renzo Furlan (third round)
  Albert Costa (third round)
  Paul Haarhuis (second round)
  Carlos Costa (first round)
  Alberto Berasategui (quarterfinals)
  Jiří Novák (second round)
  Bohdan Ulihrach (third round)

Draw

Finals

Top half

Section 1

Section 2

Bottom half

Section 3

Section 4

References
 1996 Trofeo Conde de Godó Draw

Singles